Echo de Varsovie ('Echo of Warsaw') was a French language biweekly newspaper published from Warsaw. The newspaper was founded in 1930. As of 1937, its director was Lucien Roquigny.

References

1930 establishments in Poland
Biweekly newspapers
Defunct newspapers published in Poland
French-language newspapers published in Europe
Newspapers published in Warsaw
Newspapers established in 1930
Publications with year of disestablishment missing